Moussa Faki Mahamat (born 21 June 1960) is a Chadian politician and diplomat who has been the elected Chairperson of the African Union Commission since 14 March 2017. Previously he was Prime Minister of Chad from 24 June 2003 to 4 February 2005 and Minister of Foreign Affairs from April 2008 to January 2017. Faki, a member of the ruling Patriotic Salvation Movement (MPS), belongs to the Zaghawa ethnic group, the same group as the late President Idriss Déby.

On 6 February 2021, he was re-elected as Chairperson of the African Union Commission for another four year term from 2021-2024.

Biography
Faki was born in the town of Biltine in eastern Chad. He attended university in Brazzaville in the Republic of the Congo, where he studied law. He went into exile when Hissein Habré took power on June 7, 1982 and joined the Democratic Revolutionary Council headed by Acheikh Ibn Oumar; however, he did not return to Chad when Acheikh joined with Habré in 1988. He eventually returned on 7 June 1991, after Déby took power. He was director-general of two ministries before serving as the Director-General of the National Sugar Company (SONASUT) between 1996 and 1999.

Subsequently, he served as Director of the Cabinet of President Déby from March 1999 to July 2002, and he was Déby's campaign director for the May 2001 presidential election. Faki was then appointed as Minister of Public Works and Transport in the government of Prime Minister Haroun Kabadi, which was named on June 12, 2002. After a year in that post, he was appointed as Prime Minister by Déby on June 24, 2003, replacing Kabadi. The appointment of Faki was unusual because, with Faki being a northerner, it meant that both the President and Prime Minister would be from the north; typically the post of Prime Minister was given to a southerner in order to balance the fact that the Presidency was held by Déby, a northerner. Faki resigned in early February 2005 amidst a civil service strike and a rumored quarrel with Déby.

Faki was nominated as a member of the Economic, Social and Cultural Council on 19 January 2007, and was then elected as the Council's President in mid-February 2007. In the government of Prime Minister Youssouf Saleh Abbas, which was announced on April 23, 2008, he was appointed as Minister of Foreign Affairs.

On 30 January 2017, he was elected to succeed South Africa's Nkosazana Dlamini-Zuma as Chairperson of the African Union Commission, defeating Amina Mohamed of Kenya. Hissein Brahim Taha was appointed to replace him as Chadian Minister of Foreign Affairs on 5 February 2017. Faki took office as Chairperson of the AU Commission on 14 March 2017.

See also
List of foreign ministers in 2017

References

External links

|-

|-

1960 births
Chairpersons of the African Union Commission
Foreign ministers of Chad
Heads of government of Chad
Living people
Patriotic Salvation Movement politicians
People from Wadi Fira Region
Zaghawa people